Rufus Skillern (born May 12, 1982) is a former professional Canadian football wide receiver. He was signed by the Baltimore Ravens as an undrafted free agent in 2006. He played college football for the San Jose State Spartans.

Skillern has also played for the BC Lions.

External links
BC Lions bio

1982 births
Living people
Players of Canadian football from Oakland, California
American players of Canadian football
Canadian football wide receivers
San Jose State Spartans football players
Baltimore Ravens players
BC Lions players
Players of American football from Oakland, California